The Embarcadero and Broadway station is a light rail station in San Francisco, California, serving the San Francisco Municipal Railway's E Embarcadero and F Market & Wharves heritage railway lines. It is located on The Embarcadero at Broadway. The station opened on March 4, 2000, with the streetcar's extension to Fisherman's Wharf.

The stop is served by the  bus route, which provides service along the F Market & Wharves and L Taraval lines during the late night hours when trains do not operate.

References

External links 

SFMTA – The Embarcadero & Broadway northbound, southbound
SFBay Transit (unofficial): The Embarcadero & Broadway

Broadway
Railway stations in the United States opened in 2000